The 1938 Calgary Bronks season was the fourth season in franchise history where the team finished in 1st place in the Western Interprovincial Football Union with a 6–2 record. The Bronks played in the WIFU Finals, but lost to the Winnipeg Blue Bombers in a two-game series by a total points score of 25–9.

Regular season

Standings

Schedule

Playoffs

Winnipeg won the total-point series by 25–9. Winnipeg advances to the Grey Cup game.

References

1938 in Alberta
1938 in Canadian sports